Jaime García Arévalo (born 30 August 1977) is a Chilean football manager and former player who played as a central defender. He is the current manager of Ñublense.

Career
Born in Cartagena, García started his career with local side Atlético Cartagena. He subsequently played for San Antonio Unido, Deportes Melipilla and San Marcos de Arica before retiring.

After retiring, García subsequently became Luis Musrri's assistant at Coquimbo Unido, San Antonio Unido and Deportes La Serena. In September 2016, after Musrri left to Universidad de Chile, García was named manager of La Serena.

On 27 November 2017, García was sacked by La Serena. He was named at the helm of Santiago Morning on 19 December, but was dismissed the following 30 October.

On 2 April 2019, García replaced Germán Cavalieri at the helm of Ñublense. He achieved promotion to the Primera División in 2020 as champions, and renewed his contract on 1 February 2021.

Honours
Ñublense
Primera B de Chile: 2020

References

External links

1977 births
Living people
People from San Antonio Province
Chilean footballers
Association football defenders
San Antonio Unido footballers
Deportes Melipilla footballers
San Marcos de Arica footballers
Primera B de Chile players
Chilean football managers
Deportes La Serena managers
Santiago Morning managers
Ñublense managers
Primera B de Chile managers
Chilean Primera División managers